Donald Dee (August 9, 1943 – November 26, 2014) was an American basketball player. He played college basketball for Saint Louis and St. Mary of the Plains College.

A 6'8" forward from St. Mary of the Plains College, Dee participated in the 1968 Summer Olympics, where he won a gold medal with the United States national basketball team. He then played professionally with the Indiana Pacers of the American Basketball Association, averaging 5.7 points per game during the 1968–69 ABA season.

Dee's son, Donnie Dee, played for the Indianapolis Colts in the NFL for two seasons. His grandson Johnny Dee is a professional basketball player.

Dee died on November 26, 2014 in North Kansas City, Missouri at the age of 71.

References

External links

1968 Summer Olympics at USABasketball.com

1943 births
2014 deaths
American men's basketball players
Basketball players at the 1968 Summer Olympics
Basketball players from Missouri
College men's basketball players in the United States
Detroit Pistons draft picks
Forwards (basketball)
Indiana Pacers players
Medalists at the 1968 Summer Olympics
People from Boonville, Missouri
Olympic gold medalists for the United States in basketball
Saint Louis Billikens men's basketball players
St. Mary of the Plains College alumni